Esa Pekonen (born 4 November 1961) is a Finnish former footballer and manager.

External links and references

 
 Finland – International Player Records

1961 births
Living people
Finnish footballers
Finland international footballers
Finnish expatriate footballers
Expatriate footballers in Sweden
FC Lahti players
AIK Fotboll players
Myllykosken Pallo −47 players
Veikkausliiga players
Allsvenskan players
Finnish football managers
FC Lahti managers
Kuopion Palloseura managers
Association football defenders
Sportspeople from Lahti